The 2015 CIS/CCA Curling Championships are held from March 18 to 21 at the Kitchener-Waterloo Granite Club in Waterloo, Ontario. The host university of the event is Wilfrid Laurier University.

Men

Teams
The teams are listed as follows:

Round-robin standings
Final round-robin standings

Playoffs

Semifinals
Saturday, March 21, 9:30

Bronze-medal game
Saturday, March 21, 14:30

Final
Saturday, March 21, 14:30

Women

Teams
The teams are listed as follows:

Round-robin standings
Final round-robin standings

Playoffs

Semifinals
Saturday, March 21, 9:30

Bronze-medal game
Saturday, March 21, 14:30

Final
Saturday, March 21, 14:30

References

External links

Curling in Ontario
Sport in Waterloo, Ontario
CIS CCA Curling Championships
CIS CCA Curling Championships